Johann Friedrich Wilhelm Herbst (1 November 1743 – 5 November 1807) was a German naturalist and entomologist from Petershagen, Minden-Ravensberg. He served as a chaplain in the Prussian army. His marriage in Berlin, 1770, with Euphrosyne Luise Sophie (1742–1805), daughter of the Prussian Hofrat Libert Waldschmidt seems to have been childless.

He was the joint editor, with Carl Gustav Jablonsky, of Naturgeschichte der in- und ausländischen Insekten (1785–1806, 10 volumes), which was one of the first attempts at a complete survey of the order Coleoptera. Herbst's Naturgeschichte der Krabben und Krebse, released in installments, was the first full survey of crustaceans.

Herbst's other works included Anleitung zur Kenntnis der Insekten (1784–86, 3 volumes), Naturgeschichte der Krabben und Krebse (1782–1804, 3 volumes), Einleitung zur Kenntnis der Würmer (1787–88, 2 volumes) and Natursystem der ungeflügelten Insekten (Classification of the unwinged insects) (1797–1800, 4 parts).

Notes

External links

Natursystem der Ungeflügelten Insekten(Viertes Heft) pdf
Massachusetts University Library

Zoologica Göttingen State and University Library

1743 births
1807 deaths
People from Petershagen
German carcinologists
German lepidopterists
German naturalists
People from Minden (state)
German chaplains
18th-century German zoologists
19th-century German zoologists
Prussian Army personnel